John Fonblanque may refer to:

 John Anthony Fonblanque (1759–1837), English equity lawyer and Member of Parliament for Camelford 1802–1806
 John Samuel Martin Fonblanque (1787–1865), Commissioner of Bankruptcy 
 Sir John Pennefather, 1st Baronet (1856–1933), full name John de Fonblanque Pennefather

See also
Fonblanque (disambiguation)